UTC+09:45 is an identifier for a time offset from UTC of +09:45.

History
UTC+09:45 had been used as a time in Australia (Central Western Daylight Time, or CWDT). It was used by some roadhouses along the Eyre Highway in South Australia and Western Australia during summer while South Australia is on daylight saving time. Although it is not an official, government mandated time zone, the boundaries where it commences and ends are clearly defined and are usually shown on road maps of the area.  

UTC+09:45 has been used in 5 places in Australia, including Border Village, Caiguna, Eucla, Madura and Mundrabilla. At the moment, these areas use UTC+08:45 because Western Australia does not use daylight saving time.

As daylight saving time (Southern Hemisphere summer)
Primary town: Eucla

Oceania

Pacific Ocean

Australasia
Australia - Central Western Summer Time
Western Australia
Caiguna
Cocklebiddy
Eucla
Madura
Mundrabilla
South Australia
Border Village

External links
Find cities currently in UTC+09:45

UTC offsets
Time in Australia